Anta District is one of nine districts of the Anta Province in Peru.

Geography 
The most important river of the district is the Kachi Mayu (Quechua for "salt river"). It crosses the district from east to west.

Other mountains are listed below:

Ethnic groups 
The people in the district are mainly indigenous citizens of Quechua descent. Quechua is the language which the majority of the population (56.00%) learnt to speak in childhood, 43.75% of the residents started speaking using the Spanish language (2007 Peru Census).

Subdistrict
Anta (Anta)

Canton
Anta East (San José de Anta)
Anta West (Anta)

References